HD 63584 (HR 3038) is a solitary star in the southern circumpolar constellation Volans. With an apparent magnitude of 6.15, it is barely visible to the naked eye under ideal conditions. The star is located 420 light years away based on parallax, but is drifting away with a radial velocity of  10.4 km/s.

HD 63584 has a classification of "A0 IV/V", which states it is an A0 star with the characteristics of a main sequence and subgiant star. It has 2.58 times the Sun's mass, but a radius around 3 times that of the Sun. HD 63584 radiates at 60 times the Sun's luminosity from its photosphere at an effective temperature of 9,954 K, which gives it the blueish-white hue of an A0 star. Despite the "IV" part of the classification, HD 63584 is only 256 million years old, having completed only 59.6% of its main sequence lifetime.

References

Volantis, 18
063584
Durchmusterung objects
37720
3038
A-type main-sequence stars
A-type subgiants
Volans (constellation)